Kathy J. Byron (born September 5, 1953) is an American politician. Since 1998 she has been a Republican member of the Virginia House of Delegates, representing the 22nd district in the Virginia Piedmont, consisting of parts of Bedford, Campbell and Franklin Counties and the city of Lynchburg. Byron and her husband received a tax break designated for a person’s primary residence in Florida, she says her husband is a resident but she is not.

Virginia House of Delegates
In February 2012, Byron sponsored HB462, a bill that would require that Virginia women seeking an abortion would have to undergo a transvaginal ultrasound, without her written consent and even if it is against the wishes of her doctor.

After the controversy caused by passing of this bill by Virginia representatives, Governor Bob McDonnell amended the bill to include language that would require the written consent of the woman seeking an abortion, and would also require only a transabdominal ultrasound. However, Byron urged rejection of the amendment on its grounds that a transvaginal ultrasound is an invasive procedure because, "[i]f we want to talk about invasiveness, there's nothing more invasive than the procedure that she is about to have," she said, referring to her belief that abortions harm viable persons within the womb.

In January 2017, she proposed HB2108, a bill that would prevent municipalities from expanding beyond their current footprint and from building and offering broadband to those within the municipalities.

Electoral history

Notes

External links

1953 births
Living people
Republican Party members of the Virginia House of Delegates
Women state legislators in Virginia
21st-century American politicians
21st-century American women politicians
20th-century American politicians
20th-century American women politicians